John Beech may refer to:

 John Beech (artist) (born 1964), British artist
 John P. Beech (1844–1926), English soldier who fought in the American Civil War, recipient of the Medal of Honor

See also
 John Beach (1812–1874), US Army officer during the Black Hawk and Civil War
 John Beecher (disambiguation)